John Bohen "JB" McCuskey (born in Charleston, West Virginia) is an American politician who is the West Virginia State Auditor, having been elected in November 2016 for a term that began on January 16, 2017. He is a former Republican member of the West Virginia House of Delegates representing District 35 from 2013 to 2017. On February 28, 2023, he announced he would run for governor of West Virginia to attempt to succeed term limited governor Jim Justice.

Education
McCuskey earned his BA in political communication from George Washington University and his JD from the West Virginia University College of Law.

Elections
2012 With the redistricting of District 35, which is represented by four delegates, McCuskey was among ten candidates in the May 8, 2012 Republican Primary and placed third with 1,969 votes (18.2%). He placed fourth out of eight candidates in the November 6, 2012 General election by 41 votes with 11,325 votes (12.0%), behind incumbent Democratic Representative Doug Skaff, fellow Republican selectees Suzette Raines and Eric Nelson, and losers incumbent Democratic Representatives Bobbie Hatfield and Bonnie Brown, Democratic nominee Chris Morris, and fellow Republican nominee Fred Joseph.
2014 McCuskey was reelected to the House.
2016 McCuskey defeated Mary Ann Claytor with 58% of the vote for State Auditor.

References

External links
Campaign site

John B. McCuskey at Ballotpedia
John B. McCuskey at the National Institute on Money in State Politics

1981 births
21st-century American politicians
George Washington University School of Media and Public Affairs alumni
Lawyers from Charleston, West Virginia
Living people
Republican Party members of the West Virginia House of Delegates
Politicians from Charleston, West Virginia
State auditors of West Virginia
West Virginia lawyers
West Virginia University College of Law alumni